Alfred Benzon may refer to:

 Alfred Benzon (1823–1884), Danish pharmacist and businessman
 Alfred Benzon (1855–1932), Danish pharmacist and businessman
 Alfred Benzon A/S, Danish company